Pilgaonkar is an Indian surname. Notable people with the surname include:
 
 Sachin Pilgaonkar (born 1957), Indian actor
 Shriya Pilgaonkar (born 1989), Indian actress
 Supriya Pilgaonkar (born 1967), Indian actress, wife of Sachin

Indian surnames